JustGarciaHill.org is a social networking website for minority groups in the biological sciences. It is a membership-only site and features elements such as common interest groups for summer undergraduate researchers and a forum for discussing science policy. The website was first launched in the late 1990s and originally grew out of a database that had been created for the Coalition for the Advancement of Blacks in Biomedical Sciences, but has grown to encompass all minorities that are considered to be underrepresented in biological sciences. JustGarciaHill.org is run through ScienceJobs.com and is funded by the Clinical and Translational Science Center with additional support from The Center for Study of Gene Structure and Function.

References

External links 
 

American social networking websites
1990s establishments in the United States